Lead is a chemical element with symbol Pb and atomic number 82.

Lead or The Lead may also refer to:

Animal handling 
 Leash, or lead
 Lead (leg), the leg that advances most in a quadruped's cantering or galloping stride
 Lead (tack), a line used to lead a horse

Arts, entertainment, and media

Journalism
 Lead (news), the leading news story or leading part of a news story
 Lead, information from a source that leads to the uncovering of more interesting information
 Lead paragraph, the opening paragraph of an article

Music
Concepts
 Lead sheet, a musical score describing the essential elements of a song
 Lead, type of voice, or patch, in synthesizer
 Lead instrument 
 Lead vocalist 
 Guitar solo, a solo performed by the lead guitar
Other
 Lead (band), a Japanese hip-hop group
 "Lead", a song by Matt Brouwer from Imagerical
 The Lead (EP), an extended play by British girl group FLO

Performance
 Leading actor
 Lead and follow, the direction or guidance one dance partner communicates to the other

Television
 The Lead, a 2017 Singaporean television series
 The Lead with Jake Tapper, an American news program

Marketing and sales
 Pay per lead, a method of marketing
 Sales lead, a potential customer

Places 
 Lead, North Yorkshire, a civil parish in England
Lead, South Dakota, a city in the United States

Sports
 Lead (curling), a curling position
 Lead climbing
 Lead off, in baseball, a baserunner's position from the base he occupies
 Several meanings in card games; see Glossary of card game terms#L

Other uses
 Honda Lead, a model of scooter
 Lead, in international finance, expediting payment to take advantage of an expected change in exchange rates; see Leads and lags
 Lead, in project management, the amount of time to start an activity before a successor activity is finished, in project management
 LEAD (diode), a light-emitting and -absorbing diode
 Lead (electronics), a metallic wire for electrical devices and equipment
 Lead (engineering)
 Lead (geology), a subsurface feature with the potential to have entrapped oil or gas
 Lead (sea ice), a temporary stretch of open water in pack ice
 Lead compound, a chemical compound in drug discovery (not necessarily with lead the metal)
 Pencil lead, the graphite ("lead"), the writing core of a pencil 
 Sounding lead or sounding line, a line used to measure water depth
 Tetraethyllead or lead, a gasoline additive

See also

 Leading, the distance between the baselines of successive lines of type
 Leading-tone or leading-note
 Lead–lag compensator, a component in a control system
LED, a type of diode
 Lede (disambiguation)
 Pb (disambiguation)
 Valve timing parameter - valve lead
 Voice leading